Ewondo may refer to:

 The Ewondo, one of the Beti-Pahuin peoples of Cameroon
 The Ewondo language, the language of these people
Ewondo Populaire, a Beti-based pidgin of Cameroon, spoken in the area of the capital Yaoundé